Galit Shmueli is a data scientist who works in Taiwan as Tsing Hua Distinguished Professor at the Institute of Service Science, National Tsing Hua University. She is the author of many textbooks in business statistics and is known for her work on information quality, and on clarifying the difference between explanations and predictions in statistical analyses.

Education and career
After first-year studies at the Hebrew University of Jerusalem, Shmueli graduated summa cum laude from the University of Haifa in 1994, with a bachelor's degree in statistics and psychology. She then moved to the Technion – Israel Institute of Technology for graduate study in the statistics program of the faculty of industrial engineering and management, earning a master's degree in 1997 and completing her Ph.D. in 2000. Her dissertation, Run-Related Distributions and their Application to Industrial Statistics, was jointly supervised by Ayala Cohen and Paul D. Feigin.

After a visiting assistant professorship at Carnegie Mellon University, she became an assistant professor of statistics in the department of decision, operation, and information technologies in the Robert H. Smith School of Business at the University of Maryland, College Park in 2002, where she was tenured in 2007. After a sabbatical in Bhutan she became Professor in Residence and Co-Director of Rigsum Research Lab at the Rigsum Institute of IT & Management in Bhutan from 2010 to 2014. She joined the Indian School of Business in Hyderabad as SRITNE Chaired Professor of Data Analytics in 2011, and she co-directed the Srini Raju Centre for IT and the Networked Economy there from 2012 to 2013. She moved again to National Tsing Hua University as Tsing Hua Distinguished Professor in 2014. At National Tsing Hua University she was Director of the Center for Service Innovation & Analytics at the university's College of Technology Management from 2014 to 2020. Since 2020, she has directed the Institute of Service Science at National Tsing Hua University.

In 2020 she became the founding editor-in-chief of the INFORMS Journal on Data Science.

Books
Shmueli's books include:
Data Mining for Business Intelligence: Concepts, Techniques, and Applications (with N. R. Patel and P. Bruce, Wiley, 2006; various later editions)
Statistical Methods in eCommerce Research (with W. Jank, Wiley, 2008)
Modeling Online Auctions (with W. Jank, Wiley, 2010)
Getting Started with Business Analytics: Insightful Decision-Making (with D. R. Hardoon, Chapman & Hall / CRC, 2013)
Information Quality: The Potential of Data and Analytics to Generate Knowledge (with R. S. Kenett, Wiley, 2017)

Recognition
Shmueli was named a Fellow of the Institute of Mathematical Statistics "for extraordinary contributions to statistical methods for biosurveillance, online commerce, and information quality, and for outstanding dissemination of statistical ideas through journal and textbook publications". She is also an Elected Member of the International Statistical Institute.

References

External links
Home page

Year of birth missing (living people)
Living people
Israeli statisticians
Taiwanese statisticians
Women statisticians
University of Haifa alumni
Technion – Israel Institute of Technology alumni
University of Maryland, College Park faculty
Academic staff of the National Tsing Hua University
Fellows of the Institute of Mathematical Statistics
Elected Members of the International Statistical Institute